Zorbeez is a chamois cloth which is claimed by manufacturer Vertical Branding to be capable of absorbing over 20 fluid oz (600 mL) of liquid. It was claimed that the initial sales of the product were pleasing by the CEO of Vertical Branding Nancy Duitch. It has been proven to work by the KCBD, when it was compared with a paper towel, and a cloth towel. It prevailed against the two other products.

The product was popularized by American Pitchman Billy Mays, who advertised the product in 2009.

References

Technical fabrics